Bendu (Mandarin: 奔都乡) is a township in Dêrong County, Garzê Tibetan Autonomous Prefecture, Sichuan, China. In 2010, Bendu Township had a total population of 2,120: 1,023 males and 1,097 females: 459 aged under 14, 1,461 aged between 15 and 65 and 200 aged over 65.

See also 
 List of township-level divisions of Sichuan

References

Township-level divisions of Sichuan
Populated places in the Garzê Tibetan Autonomous Prefecture